The Marlin Model XT is a series of rimfire bolt-action rifles produced by Marlin Firearms, first saw production in 2011.  The rifle comes in several different models in both the .17 (XT-17s) and .22 calibers (XT-22s), with either a detachable box magazine or a fixed tubular magazine, and with various stocks and finishes.  It has Marlin's patented Micro-Groove riflings, and the Pro-Fire® Adjustable trigger, which is similar to the Savage AccuTrigger.

Models 

 XT-22 — Chambered for .22 Long Rifle, 22" blued sporter barrel with 16-groove riflings in 1:16" twist rate, adjustable iron sights, walnut-finished hardwood Monte Carlo comb stock and a 7-shot detachable box magazine, and the receiver grooved, drilled and tapped.  Variant models with straight comb black synthetic stocks are named XT-22R
 XT-22VR — Synthetic stock with heavy varminter barrel with recessed muzzle and no iron sights
 XT-22YR — The "youth rifle" version of the standard XT-22R, with a shortened 16.25" (instead of 22") blued barrel and 12" (instead of 13.25") length of pull
 XT-22TR — Black synthetic stock with a 17-shot tubular magazine, also chambered for .22 Short (25-shot) and .22 Long (19-shot).  There is also a stainless steel barrel version named XT-22TSR
 XT-22M — Chambered for .22 WMR, 22" blued sporter barrel with 20-groove rifling in 1:16" twist rate and adjustable iron sights, walnut-finished hardwood Monte Carlo comb stock, and either a 4-shot or 7-shot box magazine.  Models with straight comb black synthetic stocks are named XT-22MR
 XT-22MTR — Black synthetic stock with a 12-shot tubular magazine
 XT-22MTW — Wood stock with a 12-shot tubular magazine
 XT-17R — Chambered for .17 HMR, 22" blued sporter barrel with 1:9" twist rate and adjustable iron sights, black synthetic stock, and either a 4-shot or 7-shot box magazine
 XT-17V — Blued heavy varminter barrel with no iron sights, with walnut-finished hardwood Monte Carlo comb stock.  There are also a synthetic stock version named XT-17VR and a stainless steel version with laminated hardwood stock named XT-17VSL
 XT-17VSLB — Stainless steel heavy varminter barrel with no iron sights, with grey laminate thumbhole stock

References 

Marlin Firearms Company firearms
.22 LR rifles
Bolt-action rifles of the United States
Remington Arms firearms